John Lewger (1602–1665) was the first attorney practicing in Maryland, was Clerk of the Maryland House of Burgesses and was the first Secretary and Attorney General of Maryland. He is considered the father of the Maryland Bar.

He was born in London, England and educated at Trinity College, Oxford, receiving a B.A. in 1619. At college, he met Cecil Calvert, 2nd Baron Baltimore, a connection that would serve him well. He joined Trinity College's faculty in 1632.

Although Lewger was an ordained Church of England minister, he converted to Catholicism in 1635.

Lewger arrived with his wife and son in Maryland on 28 November 1637 and became the Attorney General of the Lord Proprietary. He argued his first case on 30 December 1637 in the Provincial Court.

In 1638, he set up house in St. Mary's, then Maryland's capital.  He served in the Maryland House of Burgesses (the forerunner of the Maryland General Assembly) from 1637 to 1642, of which he was made Clerk.  It was during this period that wife died. In 1644, he was made Secretary of the Province. In this latter role, during the absence of Governor Leonard Calvert, he dispatched a military party to negotiate peace with the Susquehannock tribe. He simultaneously held several provincial offices, including Commissioner in Causes Testamentary, Surveyor General, Collector and Receiver of Rents, and Justice of St. Mary's County.  While he was Secretary, Lewger acted as counsel to Lord Baltimore and was Attorney General of the province.

When St. Mary's town was attacked by Richard Ingle in 1645, Lewger's home was ransacked and he was taken prisoner and transported back to England. After a stint as a prisoner, he was released and returned to Maryland. He served in the Upper House (the forerunner of the Maryland Senate) from 1646 to 1647.

During the English Civil War, whilst King Charles I of England was held prisoner by Parliament, Lewger was directed to collect and safeguard the King's private possessions in the province.

Around October 1648 he returned to England and became a Roman Catholic priest, serving as his friend, Cecil Calvert's, chaplain. He also wrote several books. He died during the Great Plague of London in 1665 and was interred in a mass grave.

References

External links
Ph.D. thesis on Lewger hosted at Historic Saint Mary's City

1602 births
1665 deaths
Alumni of Trinity College, Oxford
Fellows of Trinity College, Oxford
St. Mary's City, Maryland
Maryland lawyers
Lawyers from London
Secretaries of State of Maryland
Infectious disease deaths in England
Maryland Attorneys General
Maryland state senators
Members of the Maryland House of Delegates
17th-century English Roman Catholic priests
17th-century English Anglican priests
Anglican priest converts to Roman Catholicism
17th-century deaths from plague (disease)
People of the English Civil War
Politicians from London
Writers from Maryland